Viverone is a comune (municipality) in the Province of Biella in the Italian region Piedmont, located about  northeast of Turin and about  south of Biella. It is on the shore of Lago di Viverone.

Viverone borders the following municipalities: Alice Castello, Azeglio, Borgo d'Ale, Piverone, Roppolo, Zimone.

Demographic evolution

World heritage site
It is home to one or more prehistoric pile-dwelling (or stilt house) settlements that are part of the Prehistoric Pile dwellings around the Alps UNESCO World Heritage Site.

Twin towns — sister cities
Viverone is twinned with:

  Povljana, Croatia

See also
Purcarel, location at Bertignano Lake

References

Cities and towns in Piedmont